Last Train from Bombay is a 1952 American drama film starring Jon Hall, Christine Larson and Lisa Ferraday.

Plot
An American diplomat is accused of murder during an Indian civil war and becomes involved in an assassination plot.

Cast
 Jon Hall as Martin Viking
 Christine Larson as Mary Anne Palmer
 Lisa Ferraday as Charlane
 Douglas Kennedy as Kevin / Brian O'Hara (as Douglas R. Kennedy)
 Michael Fox as Captain Tamil
 Donna Martell as Nawob's Daughter
 Matthew Boulton as Col. Frederick Palmer
 James Fairfax as Alfie - the Bartender
 Gregory Gaye as B. Vornin aka The Lame One
 Ken Terrell as Ceylonese Assassin

Production
The film was devised to cash in on the then-current dispute between India and Pakistan. Filming started 11 March 1952. Columbia wanted to cast Hall alongside his then wife Frances Langford. It was the last of several films Hall made for Sam Katzman.

Reception
In its review of the film, the Los Angeles Times said "you chew your fingernails."

References

External links
Last Train from Bombay at TCMDB

Review of film at Variety

1952 films
1952 drama films
American drama films
Columbia Pictures films
Films set in India
American black-and-white films
Films directed by Fred F. Sears
1950s English-language films
1950s American films